Stina Lundberg Dabrowski (born December 3, 1950) is a Swedish journalist, television host, producer, writer, and professor of television production. She has interviewed many international leaders, politicians, and celebrities. She has been a fixture on Swedish television since 1982, when she got her start as co-host on the variety show Nöjesmaskinen, together with Sven Melander. Her interviews and programs with Margaret Thatcher, Nelson Mandela, Hillary Clinton, Yasser Arafat, King Abdullah of Jordan, Madonna, Clint Eastwood and Tom Hanks have been seen by many millions in Scandinavia and Europe.

Career 
Stina Lundberg Dabrowski began her education in 1973 at Journalisthögskolan (The Department of Journalism, Media and Communication at Stockholm University). She attended the radio department of the Swedish Institute of Dramatic Art from 1979 to 1981. During her studies she worked as a freelance reporter for Swedish outlets such as the radio programme Dagens Eko and the daily paper Aftonbladet.

In 1982 Dabrowski became co-host of the popular variety show Nöjesmaskinen on Swedish National Television. Her co-host was Swedish celebrity Sven Melander. Between 1985 and 1986 Dabrowski was host of the television programs Magasinet and 20:00. She has also hosted programs for Sweden's TV4 and TV3. She has produced many of her own programs through her company, Stina Lundberg Produktion, as well as being produced by Dabrowski TV, owned by her husband and fellow journalist Kjell Dabrowski.

She has later been engaged in the issue of age discrimination of women in the television branch.

Interviews and documentaries 
Dabrowski has travelled the world, interviewing Muammar al-Gaddafi, Yasser Arafat, Hillary Clinton, Margaret Thatcher, the Dalai Lama, Nelson Mandela, Diego Maradona, Benazir Bhutto and Arnold Schwarzenegger. She has also interviewed entertainers and cultural personalities such as Madonna, Leonard Cohen, Dolly Parton, and Norman Mailer. Dabrowski has produced and hosted many documentaries and reports. Several have been controversial, such as an in-depth look at a family who are members of the Ku Klux Klan in the USA. She has made documentaries about Cuba and Colombia, as well as a unique interview with Subcomandante Marcos and a program about the Zapatist guerillas in Mexico. She has led several political debates in Sweden during election years and hosted current events programs such as Debatt on Sveriges Television (2008).

The Stina jump 
Dabrowski is known for her trademark in which the guests jump at the end of each program. The jump is frozen in mid-air and shown with the end credits after each interview. Many guests, including the Dalai Lama, jumped for Stina. Margaret Thatcher, Benazir Bhutto, and Nelson Mandela were the only guests to decline the jump.

Awards 
Dabrowski has been awarded Sweden's top journalism accolades through the years. In 1991 she received Stora Journalistpriset (The Great Journalism Award) and she has been named "most influential journalist" and "most popular TV personality" by several of the largest Swedish newspapers. In 2005, Swedish TV program Folktoppen polled the Swedish public and Dabrowski was voted "best TV host of all time".

Author and professor 
Stina Lundberg Dabrowski's book Stinas Möten was published in 2006. It contains personal accounts and behind-the-scenes stories from some of her most memorable interviews such as Nelson Mandela and Governor Arnold Schwarzenegger. Her first book, Dabrowski möter sju kvinnor, was published in 1993.

In 2008 she became a professor of television production at The University College of Film, Radio, Television and Theatre in Stockholm.

Interviews 

Astrid Lindgren
Leonard Cohen
Hillary Clinton
Al Gore
Nelson Mandela
Arnold Schwarzenegger
Dalai Lama
King Hussein of Jordan
King Abdullah and Queen Rania of Jordan
Margaret Thatcher
Mikhail Gorbachev
Muammar al-Gaddafi
Yasser Arafat
Madeleine Albright
Tariq Aziz
Norman Schwarzkopf
Benazir Bhutto, Pakistan
Subcomandante Marcos, Mexico
Ingmar Bergman
Giorgio Armani
George Soros
Queen Silvia of Sweden
Queen Margarethe of Denmark
Erik Penser
Jan Stenbeck
Peter Wallenberg
Dolly Parton
Jane Fonda
Elton John
Bette Midler
Eddie Izzard
Mel Gibson
Clint Eastwood
Tom Hanks
Richard Gere
David Bowie
Phil Collins
Mia Farrow
Madonna
Diego Maradona
Lisa Marie Presley
Norman Mailer

References

External links 
Official webpage

1950 births
Living people
Swedish television hosts
Swedish women journalists
Dramatiska Institutet alumni
Women television journalists
Stockholm University alumni
Swedish women television presenters
20th-century Swedish women
21st-century Swedish women
People from Örebro
Swedish women academics
21st-century Swedish women writers